Ashburtonite is a rare lead copper silicate-bicarbonate mineral with formula: HPb4Cu2+4Si4O12(HCO3)4(OH)4Cl.

Geological occurrence
Ashburtonite was first described as a secondary mineral in a shear zone in a series of shales and graywackes. It is an alteration product of galena and chalcopyrite. The secondary minerals within the shear consist of carbonates, arsenates, and sulfates of lead and copper, and to a much lesser extent of zinc and iron. Ashburtonite is associated with beudantite, brochantite, caledonite, cerussite, diaboleite, duftite, malachite, plattnerite, adamite, antlerite, bayldonite, bindheimite, carminite, chenevixite, chlorargyrite, chrysocolla, cinnabar, hemimorphite, hydrozincite, jarosite, lavendulan, linarite, mimetite, olivenite, paratacamite, and rosasite.

It has also been reported from the Tonopah–Belmont Mine in the Big Horn Mountains of Maricopa County, Arizona.

References

Tetragonal minerals
Minerals in space group 87
Cyclosilicates